Ty Williams (born 27 November 1980 in Innisfail, Queensland) is an Australian former professional rugby league footballer who played in the 2000s and 2010s. He played for the North Queensland Cowboys in the National Rugby League competition.

North Queensland Cowboys

Once scored 42 tries in a season as a centre for the Innisfail Leprechauns in the Cairns and district a-grade comp. Upon being signed with the Cowboys, he really developed his game and by the end of 2005 he was one of the NRL's best wingers. He played for the Cowboys in the 2005 NRL grand final which was lost to the Wests Tigers.

In 2006 Williams suffered a huge setback, tearing his Achilles tendon in Round 4 and not playing in the NRL until Round 7 of 2007.

Since returning from his injury, Williams has been in and out of the Cowboys squad, often finding form only to have further niggling injuries interfere in his career. He is one of the most versatile outside backs at the club, being able to play on the wing, in the centres, at fullback and even five-eighth.

On 28 July 2010 Williams told the Cowboys that at season's end, he would retire.

Northern Pride
Ty captained the Cairns-based Intrust Super Cup team, the Northern Pride between 2011 and 2013.

Achievements

Individual
 2003: North Queensland Club Player of the Year

Team
 2005: NRL Grand Final - North Queensland Cowboys - Runners-Up

External links
 Williams @ Cowboys.com.au

References

1980 births
Living people
Australian Aboriginal rugby league team players
Australian rugby league players
Indigenous All Stars players
Indigenous Australian rugby league players
North Queensland Cowboys players
Northern Pride RLFC players
Queensland Rugby League State of Origin players
Rugby league centres
Rugby league fullbacks
Rugby league players from Innisfail, Queensland
Rugby league wingers